Michael Joseph Fulmer (born March 15, 1993) is an American professional baseball pitcher for the Chicago Cubs of Major League Baseball (MLB). He has previously played in MLB for the Detroit Tigers and Minnesota Twins. Fulmer won the American League Rookie of the Year Award in 2016, and was an All-Star in 2017.

Career

Amateur career
Fulmer attended Deer Creek High School in Edmond, Oklahoma. As a senior, he went 10–2 with a 0.72 earned run average (ERA), 127 strikeouts and also hit .436 with six home runs. Fulmer committed to play college baseball for the Arkansas Razorbacks.

New York Mets
Fulmer was drafted by the New York Mets in the first round of the 2011 Major League Baseball Draft. He made his professional debut that season with the rookie league Gulf Coast Mets which he had a 0–1 record with a 10.13 ERA and 10 strikeouts in three starting appearances and one out of the bullpen.

Fulmer started 21 games for the Savannah Sand Gnats in 2012. He went 7–6 during the year with a 2.74 ERA and 101 strikeouts over  innings. Prior to the 2013 season, Fulmer was ranked by Baseball America as the Mets seventh best prospect. He pitched in only nine games that season between the rookie league Gulf Coast Mets and the class A advanced St. Lucie Mets due to injuries. He finished the year with a 3.33 ERA and a 3-3 record with 42 strikeouts. Fulmer started 2014 with St. Lucie and finished the year with the Double-A Binghamton Mets. He started 20 games, going 6–11 with a 4.38 ERA and 87 strikeouts.

Detroit Tigers
On July 31, 2015, the Mets traded Fulmer and Luis Cessa to the Detroit Tigers for Yoenis Céspedes. Fulmer was named the Eastern League Pitcher of the Week for the week ending August 9, 2015. He started two games for the double A Erie SeaWolves during that time and had a 2–0 record with 11 strikeouts and a 0.00 ERA. He led the league in strikeouts (11) and tied for the lead in wins (2) and ERA (0.00). On August 28, 2015, Fulmer was named the Eastern League Pitcher of the Year, and was named as the starting pitcher on the Eastern League All-Star team. Fulmer finished the season 10–3 with a 2.24 ERA and 125 strikeouts in 22 starts for Erie and Binghamton. The Tigers added him to their 40-man roster after the season.

2016
On March 18, 2016, the Tigers optioned Fulmer to the Triple-A Toledo Mud Hens. Fulmer was called up and made his major league debut on April 29, against the Minnesota Twins. Fulmer earned the win in his debut, allowing two earned runs over five innings and striking out four in a 9–2 Tigers victory. On May 21, Fulmer had his first home start at Comerica Park in Detroit, where he gave up just one earned run and recorded 11 strikeouts over seven innings, defeating the Tampa Bay Rays. Fulmer became the first Detroit Tigers rookie pitcher to strike out 11 opposing batters in one game since Pat Underwood in 1979. On June 1, Fulmer no-hit the Los Angeles Angels of Anaheim for  innings before surrendering a two-out single in the 7th to C. J. Cron. He wound up allowing two hits and no runs over  innings. On June 6, Fulmer pitched six scoreless innings, while allowing only two hits against the Toronto Blue Jays. Fulmer became the first pitcher in Tigers history to pitch three consecutive scoreless outings of six innings or more while allowing three or fewer hits.

On June 12, Fulmer pitched six scoreless innings, while allowing only two hits against the New York Yankees. Fulmer became just the second pitcher in Major League history to pitch four consecutive scoreless outings of six innings or more while allowing three or fewer hits, joining Jake Arrieta. On June 17, Fulmer's scoreless streak ended at  innings, surpassing the previous Tiger rookie record of  scoreless innings set by John Hiller in 1967. This was also the longest consecutive scoreless innings streak by a rookie pitcher in baseball since Orel Hershiser threw 32 scoreless innings in 1984, but fell short of the all-time rookie record of 35 consecutive scoreless innings set by Fernando Valenzuela in 1981. On July 1, Fulmer pitched seven scoreless innings against the Tampa Bay Rays, allowing only two hits and striking out ten. Fulmer became the first Tigers pitcher since at least 1913 to allow one or zero runs in eight consecutive starts.

On August 14, Fulmer recorded his first career major league complete game and first career shutout against the Texas Rangers. He finished the 2016 season with an 11–7 record, 3.06 ERA, 1.12 WHIP, and 132 strikeouts in 159 innings pitched. He had the lowest left on base percentage of all major league pitchers, stranding 65.6% of base runners.

Following the conclusion of the season, Fulmer was named the Sporting News AL Rookie of the Year, as voted on by a panel of players, finishing ahead of Tyler Naquin and Gary Sánchez, and was named the Major League Baseball Players Association Players Choice Award for AL Outstanding Rookie. Fulmer was also awarded the Baseball Writers' Association of America AL Rookie of the Year Award, receiving 26 of 30 first-place votes.

2017
For the first half of the 2017 season, Fulmer went 9–6 with a 3.19 ERA and 13 quality starts, earning him his first American League All-Star selection. On August 3, he was placed on the 10-day disabled list due to right elbow ulnar neuritis.  An MRI revealed no ligament damage. Fulmer was reactivated from the DL on August 14. On September 11, it was announced that Fulmer would undergo elbow surgery for ulnar nerve transposition, ending his season. He finished 2017 with a 10–12 record, 3.83 ERA, 1.15 WHIP, and 114 strikeouts in  innings.

2018
After pitching to a 3–9 record, with a 4.50 ERA prior to the 2018 All-Star break, Fulmer was placed on the 10-day disabled list July 20 with a left oblique strain. In his final start of the season on September 15, against the Cleveland Indians, he left the game without recording an out, after allowing two home runs on five pitches. On September 20, Fullmer underwent surgery on a torn meniscus in his right knee. He finished the 2018 season with a 3–12 record, with a 4.69 ERA, 1.31 WHIP and 110 strikeouts in  innings. His ERA, WHIP and hits allowed per nine innings (8.7) were all career highs.

2019
On February 15, 2019, the Tigers signed Fulmer to a one-year, $2.8 million contract following a salary arbitration hearing. On March 19, the Tigers announced that they had recommended season-ending Tommy John surgery for Fulmer after he experienced elbow pain during a bullpen session. On March 20, Fulmer revealed that he would undergo the Tommy John surgery and miss the entire 2019 season.

2020
On January 6, 2020, the Tigers signed Fulmer to a one-year, $2.8 million contract to avoid arbitration. Fulmer was medically cleared to be a full participant in the Tigers' delayed (July) spring training for the 2020 season. Fulmer was named to the Tigers opening day roster on July 23. He served in an "opener" role, pitching approximately three innings per start until he built up to more pitches. With the 2020 Detroit Tigers, Fulmer appeared in 10 games, compiling a 0–2 record with 8.78 ERA and 20 strikeouts in  innings pitched.

2021
On January 12, 2021, the Tigers and Fulmer agreed to a one-year, $3.1 million contract, avoiding arbitration. On March 26, Tigers manager A. J. Hinch announced that Fulmer would start the 2021 season in the bullpen. Following an injury to Julio Teherán, Fulmer was added back to the starting rotation. He won his first 2021 start on April 14, allowing two runs and three hits over five innings as the Tigers defeated the Houston Astros, 6–4. Fulmer was soon returned to the bullpen, and recorded his first career save in an extra-innings win over the Boston Red Sox on May 6. Overall in 2021, Fulmer appeared in 52 games (48 in relief), posting a 5–6 record, 2.97 ERA, 14 saves, 21 games finished and 73 strikeouts in  innings.

2022
On March 22, 2022, Fulmer signed a one-year, $4.95 million contract with the Tigers, avoiding arbitration.

Minnesota Twins
On August 2, 2022, Fulmer was traded to the Minnesota Twins for pitcher Sawyer GipsonLong. He made 26 appearances for Minnesota down the stretch, posting a 2-2 record and 3.70 ERA with 22 strikeouts in 24.1 innings pitched.

Chicago Cubs
On February 20, 2023, Fulmer signed a one-year, $4 million contract with the Chicago Cubs.

Pitching style
Fulmer throws hard four-seam and two-seam fastballs that average 94–97 MPH (topping out at 99 MPH). His offspeed pitches include a slider in the 88–93 MPH (topping out at 95 MPH) range, and a changeup that averages 85–88 MPH (topping out at 91 MPH). After struggling to a 6.52 ERA in his first four major league starts, Fulmer made a concerted effort to throw more changeups. It became a very effective pitch for the rest of the 2016 season, with opponents hitting the pitch at only a .167 clip. In 2017, he started to throw a knuckle curve, averaging 77-80 MPH, which he had formerly thrown in high school. In 2021, Fulmer began adding velocity to his slider, throwing it at an average of 91 MPH.

Personal life
Fulmer married girlfriend Kelsey Miles in January 2016. He works as a plumber's assistant during the offseason.

References

External links

1993 births
Living people
American League All-Stars
Baseball players from Oklahoma
Binghamton Mets players
Brooklyn Cyclones players
Detroit Tigers players
Erie SeaWolves players
Gulf Coast Mets players
Major League Baseball pitchers
Major League Baseball Rookie of the Year Award winners
Minnesota Twins players
Savannah Sand Gnats players
Sportspeople from Oklahoma City
St. Lucie Mets players
Toledo Mud Hens players